A concession stand (American English, Canadian English), snack kiosk or snack bar (British English, Irish English) is a place where patrons can purchase snacks or food at a cinema, amusement park, zoo, aquarium, circus, fair, stadium, beach, swimming pool, concert, sporting event, or other entertainment venue. Some events or venues contract the right to sell food to third parties.  Those contracts are often referred to as a concession — hence the name for a stand where food is sold. Usually prices for goods at concession stands are greater than elsewhere for the convenience of being close to an attraction, with outside food and drink being prohibited, and they often contribute significant revenue to the venue operator (especially in the case of movie theaters).

History
Concession stands were not originally operated by the movie theaters, and food was often sold by people attending the film or by vendors outside of the theater.

Movie theaters were at first hostile to food being brought into their facilities, but during the Great Depression, theaters added concession stands as a way to increase revenue in the economically stagnant times. By the 1930s, concession stands were a main fixture in many theaters. During World War II, candy was scarce at concession stands because of the sugar rationing going on at the time, and popcorn became more popular than before.

In the late 1940s, and early 1950s, as movie ticket sales were down, sales of food at concession stands increased. In the US concession owners are represented by the National Association of Concessionaires and the National Independent Concessionaires Association.

Gallery

References

External links

 What makes a good concession stand

Restaurants by type
Cinemas and movie theaters